John Bingley Garland (b. Poole England, 1791; d. 1875), merchant, politician, became the first Speaker of the House of Assembly of Newfoundland in 1833.

Garland, the son of George Garland Sr. and Amy Lester, was sent to Trinity, Newfoundland, to manage the firm of Garland and Sons. Shortly after arriving, both he and his brother were appointed Justices of the Peace. Both Garlands were responsible for the construction of St. Paul's church in Trinity, which opened in 1821.

Garland returned to England in 1821 and was elected Mayor of Poole in 1824 and in 1830 and pricked High Sheriff of Dorset for 1827-28. When George Garland Sr. died, the entire enterprise was handed over to Garland and his brother. The business was a very important mercantile business in the fish trade for Newfoundland. In 1832, Garland with his wife (Deborah Vallis) and children returned to Newfoundland. He ran for the seat in Trinity in the first general election of Newfoundland in 1832. He left the assembly after he was invited by Governor Cochrane to join the Executive Council.

He was married twice: first to Deborah Vallis in 1822 and then, after her death, to Fanny Marie Read.

Garland left Newfoundland in 1834 to return to England following the death of his brother George Garland in 1833. He died at Wimborne, Dorset, at the age of 83.

References

1791 births
1875 deaths
Newfoundland Colony people
Speakers of the Newfoundland and Labrador House of Assembly
Mayors of Poole
High Sheriffs of Dorset